Lamar is an unincorporated community in southern Washington County, Tennessee.

Education
Lamar is the location of Lamar Elementary School.

References

Unincorporated communities in Washington County, Tennessee
Unincorporated communities in Tennessee